Jon Harnett (born May 28, 1988 in Orangeville, Ontario) is a former professional indoor lacrosse defenceman who played for the Calgary Roughnecks, Boston Blazers, Vancouver Stealth and Buffalo Bandits in the National Lacrosse League. He was drafted by the Boston Blazers in the 3rd round (26th overall) in the 2008 NLL Entry Draft. His brother Greg is also a professional lacrosse player.

References

1988 births
Living people
Boston Blazers players
Buffalo Bandits players
Calgary Roughnecks players
Canadian lacrosse players
Lacrosse defenders
Lacrosse people from Ontario
People from Orangeville, Ontario

Vancouver Warriors players